The Iporá Microregion is a geographical region in central-western Goiás state, Brazil.

Municipalities 
The microregion consists of the following municipalities:

See also
List of municipalities in Goiás
Microregions of Goiás

References

Microregions of Goiás